Let's Have a Party is the debut album by the American rock band the Rivieras released in 1964 by USA Records. This album contains the band's biggest hit, "California Sun", which reached number five on the Billboard Hot 100 chart. The album continues the band's popular surf style, and contains covers of classic and contemporary rock and roll hits. The album's title track is a cover of Elvis Presley's "Let's Have a Party", written by Jessie Mae Robinson.

The album was reissued in Sweden in 1967 with the name California Sun!! by Sonet and Grand Prix Records. Another album sharing the title Let's Have a Party was released in Sweden in 1989 by Star-Club Records, but features an entirely different track listing; Side A is non-LP single tracks, and Side B has tracks from Campus Party. All tracks from Let's Have a Party were later compiled onto California Sun: The Best of the Rivieras in 2000.

Background
With the band's newfound success with "California Sun", the Rivieras set out to record a full-length effort in February 1964 at Chicago's Columbia Recording Studios ("California Sun" was previously recorded in July 1963). While "California Sun" had become the band's biggest hit at this point, the band's original singer, Marty Fortson and guitarist, Joe Pennell had both left for the Marines. By the time of recording, they had been replaced by Bill Dobslaw and Jim Boal, respectively. Fortson and Pennell are uncredited for their contributions on "California Sun". Dobslaw aside, all members of the band were currently attending high school in South Bend, Indiana by the time of the album's release.

Track listing

Original release

Star-Club Records release

Personnel
 Bill Dobslaw —  singer, management, producer
 Paul Dennert —  drums
 Otto Nuss —  organ
 Doug Gean —  bass guitar
 Jim Boal —  lead guitar
 Willie Gaut —  rhythm guitar, vocals (lead vocals on "Killer Joe")
 Marty "Bo" Fortson —  lead vocals, rhythm guitar on "California Sun"
 Joe Pennell —  lead guitar on "California Sun"

Production
 Bill Thomson —  engineer
 Don Bronstein — cover
 Jim Golden — liner notes
 Miriam Linna — liner notes (Star-Club Records version)

References

Rock-and-roll albums
1964 albums